

Geography

 Kebar Dam, an early arch dam in Iran, located by the Kebar River
 Kebar or Chebar River, also known as Kebar Canal, in the vicinity of Tel Abib, mentioned in the Biblical book of Ezekiel
 Kebar Valley, located in West Papua
 Djebel el Kébar, a mountain in central Tunisia

Other

 Mpur language, also known as Kebar, a language of West Papua
 Kebar airport, located in West Papua
 SS West Kebar, an American cargo ship sunk in World War II
 KEBAR, a record label of the Jamaican duo Keith & Tex